Sargeant Bay Provincial Park, is a provincial park in British Columbia, Canada, located just west of the community of Sechelt on the southern Sunshine Coast. Created in 1990 at 57 ha. in size, the park was expanded to approximately 146 ha. in 1997.

See also
List of British Columbia provincial parks

References

BC Parks infopage

Provincial parks of British Columbia
Sunshine Coast (British Columbia)
Protected areas established in 1990
1990 establishments in British Columbia